"Tulsa Time" is a song written by Danny Flowers, and recorded by American country music artist Don Williams. It was released in October 1978 as the first single from the album Expressions. It was Williams' eighth number one on the country chart, spending a single week at number one and eleven weeks in the top 40. It was also recorded by Eric Clapton for his 1978 album Backless and a live version by Clapton from his album Just One Night became a #30 Billboard hit in 1980.

Background and recording

In September, 1978, Flowers and the Don Williams band members were staying at a Sheraton Hotel in Tulsa, Oklahoma. A snowstorm had caused an interruption of their schedule. Flowers said, "We were all snowed in, and there was absolutely nothing to do. I was sitting there in my room, watching ‘The Rockford Files’ with some hotel stationery beside me, just bored, and I started writing out some verses”. He spent only a half-hour on it and the song had only two chords. Flowers said he intended to add another chord later, "but Don heard it and liked it the way it was."

About two months later, Flowers was performing with Don Williams in Nashville as the opening act for an Eric Clapton concert. After the performance, Flowers and Williams went to Clapton's hotel room where the three men took turns playing songs. Flowers sang and played guitar on his new song, "Tulsa Time" with Williams singing harmony and Clapton playing slide guitar on a dobro. Clapton said, "I love that song and I want to record it right away". Williams said, "You can't record it— I'm going to record it". Both artists recorded the song, but Williams was first.

Don Williams' recording of "Tulsa Time" was the first song on his album, "Expressions", released in August, 1978. By October the song was number one on the country singles chart.
It became the number one Billboard Country song of 1979. The song was named single record of the year in 1979 by the Academy of Country Music and Don Williams won CMA Male Vocalist of the Year. 
Eric Clapton released two versions of the song: first his 1979 album Backless and second in 1980 on a live album, Just One Night. The latter version was more successful and reached number 30 on the U.S. Billboard Hot 100 singles chart.

Charts

Don Williams version

Weekly charts

Year-end charts

Eric Clapton version

Weekly charts

Other versions
 A live version from 1978 appears on Eric Clapton's Crossroads 2: Live in the Seventies, a boxed set released in 1996. This is a different performance from that featured on Just One Night.
 Reba McEntire recorded "Tulsa Time" for her 1995 album Starting Over but it was not included on the final release. It was eventually released on her 1999 compilation album Comfort from a Country Quilt.
 Jason Boland & the Stragglers recorded "Tulsa Time"' for their 2010 live album High in the Rockies.
 After Williams' death, Brothers Osborne sang the song as a tribute during the 51st Annual Country Music Association Awards on November 8, 2017.

Notes

References

1978 singles
1978 songs
Eric Clapton songs
Don Williams songs
Songs written by Danny Flowers
Song recordings produced by Garth Fundis
ABC Records singles
Songs about Tulsa, Oklahoma